The premier of Tasmania is the head of the executive government in the Australian state of Tasmania. By convention, the leader of the party or political grouping which has majority support in the House of Assembly is invited by the governor of Tasmania to be premier and principal adviser.

Since 8 April 2022, the premier of Tasmania has been Jeremy Rockliff, leader of the Liberal Party, which holds 13 of the 25 seats in the House of Assembly.

List of premiers of Tasmania
Before the 1890s, there was no formal party system in Tasmania. Party labels before that time indicate a general tendency only. The current convention of appointing the premier from the House of Assembly was not generally applied prior to 1920, with premiers often appointed from the Legislative Council.

Graphical timeline

See also

List of premiers of Tasmania by time in office
Leader of the Opposition (Tasmania)
Governors of Tasmania

Notes

External links
PREMIERS OF TASMANIA Parliament of Tasmania

Tasmania

Premiers
1856 establishments in Australia
Ministers of the Tasmanian state government